An access network is a type of  telecommunications network which connects subscribers to their immediate service provider. It is contrasted with the core network, which connects local providers to one another.  The access network may be further divided between feeder plant or distribution network, and drop plant or edge network.

Telephone heritage
An access network, also referred to as an outside plant, refers to the series of wires, cables and equipment lying between a consumer/business telephone termination point (the point at which a telephone connection reaches the customer) and the local telephone exchange. The local exchange contains banks of automated switching equipment which direct a call or connection to the consumer. The access network is perhaps one of the oldest assets a telecoms operator would own.

In 2007–2008 many telecommunication operators experienced increasing problems maintaining the quality of the records which describe the network. In 2006, according to an independent Yankee Group report, globally operators experience profit leakage in excess of $17 billion each year.

The access network is also perhaps the most valuable asset an operator owns since this is what physically allows them to offer a service.

Access networks consist largely of pairs of copper wires, each traveling in a direct path between the exchange and the customer. In some instances, these wires may even consist of aluminum, which was commonly used in the 1960s and 1970s following a massive increase in the cost of copper. The price increase was temporary, but the effects of this decision are still felt today as electromigration within the aluminum wires can cause an increase in on-state resistance. This resistance causes degradation which can eventually lead to the complete failure of the wire to transport data.

Access is essential to the future profitability of operators who are experiencing massive reductions in revenue from plain old telephone services, due in part to the opening of historically nationalized companies to competition, and in part to increased use of mobile phones and voice over IP (VoIP) services. Operators offered additional services such as xDSL based broadband and IPTV (Internet Protocol television) to guarantee profit. The access network is again the main barrier to achieving these profits since operators worldwide have accurate records of only 40% to 60% of the network. Without understanding or even knowing the characteristics of these enormous copper spider webs, it is very difficult, and expensive to 'provision' (connect) new customers and assure the data rates required to receive next-generation services.

Access networks around the world evolved to include more and more optical fiber technology. Optical fiber already makes up the majority of core networks and will start to creep closer and closer to the customer, until a full transition is achieved, delivering value-added services over fiber to the home (FTTH).

Access process

The process of communicating with a network begins with an access attempt, in which one or more users interact with a communications system to enable initiation of user information transfer. An access attempt itself begins with issuance of an access request by an access originator.

An access attempt ends either in successful access or in access failure - an unsuccessful access that results in termination of the attempt in any manner other than initiation of user information transfer between the intended source and destination (sink) within the specified maximum access time.

Access time is the time delay or latency between a requested access attempt and successful access being completed.  In a telecommunications system, access time values are measured only on access attempts that result in successful access.

Access failure can be the result of access outage, user blocking, incorrect access, or access denial. Access denial (system blocking) can include: 
Access failure caused by the issuing of a system blocking signal by a communications system that does not have a camp-on busy signal feature. 
Access failure caused by exceeding the maximum access time and nominal system access time fraction during an access attempt.

Charging for access
An access charge is a charge made by a local exchange carrier for use of its local exchange facilities for a purpose such as the origination or termination of network traffic that is carried to or from a distant exchange by an interexchange carrier.

Although some access charges are billed directly to interexchange carriers, a significant percentage of all access charges are paid by the local end users.

Mobile access networks

 GERAN
 UTRAN
 E-UTRAN
 CDMA2000
 GSM
 UMTS
 1xEVDO
 voLTE
 Wi-Fi in* WiMAX

Optical distribution network
A passive optical distribution network (PON) uses single-mode optical fiber in the outside plant, optical splitters and optical distribution frames, duplexed so that both upstream and downstream signals share the same fiber on separate wavelengths. Faster PON standards generally support a higher split ratio of users per PON, but may also use reach extenders/amplifiers where extra coverage is needed. Optical splitters creating a point to multipoint topology are also the same technology regardless of the type of PON system, making any PON network upgradable by changing the optical network terminals (ONT) and optical line terminal (OLT) terminals at each end, with minimal change to the physical network.

Access networks usually also must support point-to-point technologies such as Ethernet, which bypasses any outside plant splitter to achieve a dedicated link to the telephone exchange. Some PON networks use a "home run" topology where roadside cabinets only contain patch panels so that all splitters are located centrally. While a 20% higher capital cost could be expected, home run networks may encourage a more competitive wholesale market since providers' equipment can achieve higher use.

See also
 Edge device
 Hierarchical internetworking model
 Internet access
 IP connectivity access network
 Local loop
 Passive Optical Network

References

External links
   Interactive presentation introducing the technology and design of access networks

Telecommunications infrastructure
Network access
Fiber to the premises